Donald Olson may refer to:
 Donny Olson, member of the Alaska Senate
 Donald Olson (astronomer), astrophysicist and forensic astronomer

See also
 Donald Olsen, American architect
 Donald P. Olsen, American violinist, educator and painter